Panama made its Paralympic Games début at the 1992 Summer Paralympics in Barcelona, with a delegation of two competitors in athletics. It has participated in every subsequent edition of the Summer Paralympics, but never in the Winter Paralympics. Panamanian delegations have always been small, never consisting in more than two competitors.

Nonetheless, Panama has won eight Paralympic medals: three gold, four silver, and one bronze. All of Panama's medals have been won by a single athlete, visually impaired runner (T13 classification) Said Gomez, over the span of four Games, from 1992 to 2004. In 1992, 1996 and 2000, Gomez medalled in all the events he entered. In 2004, he entered two races, winning silver in the 5,000m, but finishing 'only' fifth in the 10,000m. In 2008, for the first time, he failed to win any medal, being eliminated in the heats in both the 1,500m and the 5,000m races.  In 2012 he was eliminated in the heats in both the 800m and 1500m races.

Only three other people have represented Panama at the Paralympics. Runner Ernesto Archer was eliminated in the heats of both his races in 1992, and did not compete again. Désirée Aguilar competed in freestyle swimming in 2004 and 2008, but did not advance past the heats. Katherina Taylor competed in athletics in 2012, and was eliminated in the heats of both her 200m and 400m races.

List of medallists

See also
 Panama at the Olympics

References